Morgan ap Hywel (died ) was Lord of Gwynllwg in Wales from about 1215 until his death in 1245, and for many years laid claim to the lordship of Caerleon, which had been seized by the Earl of Pembroke. For most of his life he was at peace with the English, at a time when there were periodic revolts by Welsh leaders against their rule.
He may have participated in a crusade between 1227 and 1231.

Background

Morgan ap Hywel was descended from Rhydderch ap Iestyn, a ruler of most of southern Wales whose grandson Caradog ap Gruffydd  was killed in the Battle of Mynydd Carn in 1081.
By the time of Caradog's death the Normans had taken control of Gwent and Gwynllwg was contested, and in the following years of the Norman conquest of Wales the Welsh royalty lost many strongholds and became subordinate to the English crown.
Caradog's son Owain ap Caradog may have managed to hold onto Caerleon, and is mentioned in 1140, and his son Morgan ab Owain was recognized as lord of Caerleon by King Henry II of England (r. 1154–1189) before Morgan was killed by Ifor Bach in 1158 and succeeded by Iorwerth ab Owain Wan, his brother.

Henry II confiscated Caerlon from Iorwerth in September 1171 for undocumented reasons.
In 1172 men of William Fitz Robert, 2nd Earl of Gloucester killed Iorwerth's son Owain, and Iowerth and his surviving son Hywel launched a rebellion against the Normans.
Iowerth attended the council of Gloucester in June 1175, where Caerlon was restored to him at the urging of Rhys ap Gruffydd (1132–97), lord of Deheubarth.
Hywel ab Iorwerth seems to have succeeded his father as lord of Caerlon by 1184.
He guarded castles in Glamorgan and Gwynllwg for the king during the Welsh revolt of 1184–85, and continued to serve the crown in the reign of Richard I of England (r. 1189–1199).
Hywel of Caerlon appears to have died during the attacks that Llywelyn the Great led against the royal and Marcher lands in Wales in the early summer of 1215.

Life
Morgan ap Hywel, who succeeded his father Hywel, lost Caerleon in October 1217 to the forces of  William Marshal, 1st Earl of Pembroke (1146–1219), lord of Striguil.
Morgan's claim to Caerleon was dismissed by a council at Worcester in 1218, but he was again arguing his claim in 1220.
In 1227 Morgan finally quitclaimed his right to Caerleon in favour of William Marshal the younger.
He may have then participated in the final wave of the fifth crusade between 1227 and 1231.

Although Morgan was unable to regain Caerleon he managed to retain Machen Castle for most of his life.
Morgan strengthened this castle by the addition of a tower.
He probably built the round tower keep of Machen Castle, or Castell Meredydd, in 1217.
Gilbert Marshal, 4th Earl of Pembroke, captured Castell Meredydd in 1236 during a truce between Llywelyn the Great and King Henry III of England.
After Marshal took the castle he seems to have fortified it with a bailey and curtain wall.
He was forced to return it to Morgan by the terms of the truce, or "for fear of the lord Llywelyn".
Some traces of the foundations of this castle may still be seen on the natural rocky motte on which it was built.

Morgan was one of the few Welsh leaders who did not join the revolt of Dafydd ap Llywelyn in June 1244.
Morgan died not long before 15 March 1248.
At the time of his death he held Machen castle in the uplands of Gwynllwg and the commotes of Edeligion and Llenbenydd in the lordship of Caerleon in Gwent.
He was succeeded by his grandson Merdudd ap Gruffudd (died 1270), son of his daughter Gwerful and of Gryffudd ap Maredud, a grandson of Lord Rhys.

Notes

Sources

People from Caerleon
1248 deaths
History of Monmouthshire